Plectranthus verticillatus (syn. Plectranthus nummularius), Swedish ivy, Swedish begonia or whorled plectranthus is a plant in the family Lamiaceae (Labiatae), genus Plectranthus. Despite its common name, it is not close to the ivy family of the genus Hedera.

Description
The plant has aromatic glossy, green, round leaves, which show a deep purple color in the center sometimes and tend to trail, reaching a height of between 10 and 30 cm and extends around 60 cm. This deep purple can also be found on the plant stems and on the underside of leaves. The leaves, which are widely serrated, are fleshy and rounded between 64 and 90 mm, with purple and hairy undersides with reddish sessile glands.

The upright racemes appear white, pale violet or pale pink and can sprout sporadically throughout the year (but more typically in spring and late autumn), which form verticillasters of 2-4 flowers and 2–3 mm bracts. The fruits are 1 mm nuts, brown in colour and wrinkled.

The name "Swedish ivy" is deceptive: the plant is not thigmotropic (meaning it does not cling to walls with the roots when it grows), is not native to Sweden, and is not closely related to the genus of ivy (Hedera). Some variegated, silvery plants called Swedish Ivy grown in pots and hanging baskets are Plectranthus oertendahlii from coastal river gorges of KwaZulu-Natal.

Distribution
Plectranthus verticillatus is native to southern Africa where it occurs in the Cape Provinces, KwaZulu-Natal, Eswatini, the Northern Provinces and southern Mozambique. It is found naturalized in El Salvador, Honduras, the Leeward Islands, the Venezuela Antilles, the Windward Islands, Venezuela, Puerto Rico, Hawaii as well as south-east Queensland and coastal areas of New South Wales in Australia.

Use as ornamental plant
Plectranthus verticillatus is a robust plant doing well in indirect sunlight, mostly cultivated as hanging houseplant. In frost-free areas, it is also found as groundcover in gardens or sprouting down walls.

It likes to stay moist and it also responds well to pruning. It can easily be rooted with cuttings and its vulnerability is low; but a weak plant can be infested with spider mites.

A notable specimen of Plectranthus verticillatus can be found above the mantel in the President of the United States' Oval Office.  It was a gift to President John F. Kennedy in 1961, and can be seen in photographs taken in the office during every administration since.  Interns, aides, and other white house workers are often granted clippings of the famous plant which they grow and further distribute to friends and family.

Gallery

References

External links
 New South Wales Flora Online - Plectranthus verticillatus

verticillatus
Flora of Southern Africa
Garden plants
House plants